Aeroflot Flight 5003 may refer to two aviation accidents:
Aeroflot Flight 5003 (1967), involving an Antonov 12B
Aeroflot Flight 5003 (1977), involving an Ilyushin Il-18

Flight number disambiguation pages